A handyman, also known as a fixer, handyperson or handyworker, maintenance worker, repair worker, or repair technician, is a person skilled at a wide range of repairs, typically for keeping buildings, shops or equipment around the home in good repair. These tasks include trade skills, repair work, maintenance work, are both interior and exterior, and are sometimes described as "side work", "odd jobs" or "fix-up tasks". Specifically, these jobs could be light plumbing jobs such as fixing a leaky toilet or light electric jobs such as changing a light fixture or bulb.

The term handyman increasingly describes a paid worker, but it also includes non-paid homeowners or do-it-yourselfers. The term handyman is also occasionally applied as an adjective to describe politicians or business leaders who make substantial organizational changes, such as overhauling a business structure or administrative division.

Many people can do common household repairs. There are resources on the Internet, as well as do-it-yourself guide books, with instructions about how to complete a wide range of projects. Sometimes the fix-it skill is seen as genetic, and people lacking such skills are said to "lack the handy-man gene". One trend is that fewer homeowners are inclined to do fix-up jobs, perhaps because of time constraints, perhaps because of lack of interest; one reporter commented "my family's fix-it gene petered out before it reached my generation."

Historically being a handyman was considered a less prestigious occupation than a specialist such as a plumber, electrician, or carpenter. With the emergence of large national chains, there have been efforts to change that perception by emphasizing the professionalism of the trade and that a handyman is a technician with multiple skills and a wide range of knowledge. Handyman tools sometimes become useful in different places: for example, when a proper cranial drill was not available, an Australian doctor used a handyman's drill in 2009 to open a hole in the head of a 13-year-old boy to relieve pressure after a brain injury; the boy's life was saved.

Projects

Tasks range from minor to major, from unskilled to highly skilled, and include painting, drywall repair, remodeling, minor plumbing work, minor electrical work, household carpentry, sheetrock, crown moulding, and furniture assembly (see more complete list below.)

Businesses

Market estimates
An estimate was that in 2003, the market for home-maintenance and repair spending was up 14% from 2001 to 2003. Another estimate was that the market in the United States was $126 billion and was increasing by about 4% annually. American homes are aging; one estimate was that in 2007, more than half of all homes are older than 25 years. And, as populations worldwide tend to become older, on average, and since increasingly elderly people will be less inclined and able to maintain their homes, it is likely that demand for handyman services will grow.

Independent operators
Many towns have handymen who work part-time, for friends or family or neighbors, who are skilled in a variety of tasks. Sometimes they advertise in newspapers or online. They vary in quality, professionalism, skill level, and price. Contractors often criticize the work of previous contractors, and this practice is not limited to handymen, but to all trades. Handymen have advertised their services through flyers and mailings; in addition, free websites such as Craigslist and SkillSlate help customers and handymen find each other.

Franchise businesses
In 2009, there were national handyman service firms which handle such nationwide tasks as public relations, marketing, advertising, and signage, but sell specific territories to franchise owners. A franchise contract typically gives a franchise owner the exclusive right to take service calls within a given geographical area. The websites of these firms put possible customers in touch with local owners, which have handymen and trucks. Customers call the local numbers. Typically these firms charge around $100/hour, although fees vary by locality and time of year. In many parts of the world, there are professional handyworker firms that do small home or commercial projects which claim possible advantages such as having workers who are insured and licensed. Their branch offices schedule service appointments for full-time and part-time handymen to visit and make repairs, and sometimes coordinate with sub-contractors.

One Lehman Brothers executive, after being let go from the Wall Street firm, bought a Union, New Jersey franchise from a national handyman firm. A franchise was approximately $110,000 with a franchise fee of $14,900, according to a spokesperson for a national handyman franchise.

Some see a benefit of franchising as "entrepreneurship under the safety net of a tried-and-true business umbrella" but forecast a 1.2 percent decrease in franchise businesses during the 2008–2009 recession. In 2005, according to a survey released by the Washington-based International Franchise Association showed 909,000 franchised establishments in the United States employing some 11 million people. Franchises offer training, advertising and information technology support, lower procurement costs and access to a network of established operators.

Franchise handyman firms sometimes pitch clients by asking prospective customers about their unresolved "to-do lists". The firm does odd jobs, carpentry, and repairs. Trends such as a "poverty of time" and a "glut of unhandy husbands" has spurred the business. Technicians do a range of services including tile work, painting, and wallpapering. "One firm" charges $88 per hour. The firm targets a work category which full-fledged remodelers and contractors find unprofitable. A consumer was quoted by a reporter explaining the decision to hire one firm: "'I couldn't find anyone to come in and help me because the jobs were too small', said Meg Beck of Huntington, who needed some painting and carpentry done. She turned to one franchise firm and said she liked the fact that the service has well-marked trucks and uniformed technicians and that a dispatcher called with the names of the crew before they showed up." There are indications that these businesses are growing. There are different firms operating.

Other competitors include online referral services. In addition, some large home centers offer installation services for products such as cabinets and carpet installation. Sometimes homeowners contact a professional service after trying, but failing, to do repair work themselves; in one instance, a Minneapolis homeowner attempted a project but called a technician to finish the project, and the overall cost was substantial.

Assessment of handyman options

How well do the franchise chains perform? One Wall Street Journal reporting team did an informal assessment by hiring handymen all over the United States and asking them to fix a wide range of problems, from a relatively routine leaky faucet to a sticky door. The reporter concluded that "with few licensing requirements and standards for the industry, prices are all over the board." One quote was ten times as large as another. Further, the reporter concluded: "A big corporate name is no guarantee of quality or speedy service." One corporate firm took three weeks to fix a stuck door. Service varied from spotty to good, with complaints about unreturned phone calls, service people standing on dining room chairs, leaving holes between wood planking, but liked getting multiple jobs done instead of just one. Customers liked handymen wearing hospital booties (to avoid tracking dirt in houses). The reporter chronicled one experience with repairing a water-damaged ceiling. A franchise firm fixed it for $1,530; a second (non-franchise local handyman) fixed a similar ceiling for $125. The reporter preferred the second worker, despite the fact that he "doesn't have a fancy van – or carry proof of insurance". Tips for selecting a good handyman include: Do your homework, check out reviews and do an online search to find out as much as you can about the person who will come to your house. For small jobs, the cheapest way is to pay time and material. You can't expect someone to spend an hour driving to your house for a couple of hours of work. Ask questions, get written estimates on company stationery, make sure handymen guarantee their work, pay with credit cards or checks because this provides an additional record of each transaction, check references and licenses, review feedback about the contractors from Internet sites. To find a competent worker, one can seek referrals from local sources such as a school or church or office park, to see if a staff handyman does projects on the side, as well as ask friends for referrals; a general contractor might have workers who do projects on the side as well. Further, one can try out a new handyman with easy projects such as cleaning gutters to see how well they perform.

Legal issues

Generally, in the United States, there are few legal issues if an unpaid homeowner works on a project within their own home, with some exceptions. Some jurisdictions require paid handymen to be licensed and/or insured. New Jersey, for example, requires all handymen who work in for-profit businesses serving residential and commercial customers, to be registered and insured. Often handymen are barred from major plumbing, electrical wiring, or gas-fitting projects for safety reasons, and authorities sometimes require workers to be licensed in particular trades. However, minor plumbing work such as fixing water taps, connecting sinks, fixing leaks, or installing new washing machines, are usually permitted to be done without licensing. Many handymen are insured under a property damage liability policy, so that accidental property damage from negligence or accidents are covered.

In popular culture
The handyman image recurs in popular culture. There have been songs about handymen recorded by Elvis Presley in 1964, Del Shannon in 1964, James Taylor in 1977. There are femme-fatale TV characters who fall for handymen. Handymen have been portrayed in books and films, generally positively, as do-gooder helpful types, but not particularly smart or ambitious. In a book by author Carolyn See called The Handyman, a handyman is really an aspiring but discouraged artist who transforms the lives of people he works for, as well as having sexual encounters with some of his clients, and his experiences improve his artistic output. The book suggests handymen discover "the appalling loneliness of the women who call him for help" whose needs are sometimes "comic," sometimes "heartbreaking," and deep down "sexual". A 1980 movie called The Handyman was about a carpenter-plumber who was "good at what he does" but is "too honest and trusting," and gets taken advantage of by "women who find him handsome and understanding;" the movie earned negative reviews from critic Vincent Canby. Other movies have used a rather tired formula of sexy-handyman meets bored-housewives, such as The Ups and Downs of a Handyman, a 1975 movie in which "Handsome Bob also finds he's a fast favorite with the local housewives, who seem to have more than small repairs on their minds." In Canada, there's a television show called Canada's Worst Handyman which is a reality show in which handyman contestants try their best on jobs in order to not be labeled worst handyman. Home Improvement is an American television sitcom starring Tim Allen, which aired 1991 to 1999. On the children's television show Mister Rogers' Neighborhood, Handyman Negri was one of the characters residing in The Neighborhood of Make-Believe, as well as the neighborhood Mister Rogers resides in. Handy Manny is an American/Hispanic preschool television show that airs on Playhouse Disney and stars a handyman cartoon character named Manny. The Belgian comics and media franchise The Smurfs depicts Handy Smurf with traditional handyman's accoutrements, such as overalls, carpenter's pencil and work hat. Happy Tree Friends also has an orange beaver named Handy who is a handyman.

Two handymen are also the main characters in the Czechoslovak, later Czech,  stop-motion animated series Pat & Mat.

List of jobs
The list of projects which handymen can do is extensive, and varies from easy-to-learn tasks which take little time such as changing a light bulb, to extensive projects which require multiple steps, such as kitchen remodeling. Here is a partial list:

 Appraising of property
 Barbecue pit maintenance
 Cabinet refacing
 Carpentry
 Ceiling repair
 Ceramic tile repair
 Cleaning
 Concrete work
 Countertops
 Crown moulding
 Curtain hanging
 Decks
 Door installation
 Door repair
 Dryer repair
 Dryer vent cleaning
 Dryer vent installation
 Drywall installation
 Drywall repair
 Electrical repairs 
 Energy updates
 Fan installation
 Fence fixing
 Fireplace cleaning
 Flooring installation and repair
 Foundation repairs 
 Framing
 Garage door openers
 Garage doors
 General maintenance
 Gutter cleaning
 Gutter Repair
 Heating and air conditioning system tune-up
 Home inspections
 Home security systems
 Hot tubs and spas

 Insulation installation (batts)
 Insulation installation (blown-in)
 Lamp repairs
 Landscaping
 Lawn care
 Lock set adjustment
 Maid service
 Molding installation
 Moving
 Paint removal
 Painting
 Patio stone installation
 Pest control
 Plumbing repairs
 Porch repairs 
 Remodeling basements
 Remodeling bathrooms
 Remodeling kitchens
 Roofing
 Safety modifications
 Sealing driveways
 Senior living modifications
 Septic system repair
 Shelf installation
 Shelving
 Skylight installation
 Solar panels
 Soundproofing
 Sprinkler repairs
 Stain removal
 Staining furniture
 Stone work
 Storage area construction
 Storage area repair
 Swapping a toilet

 Tiling
 Tile and grout cleaning
 Re-grouting
 Trash removal
 TV mounting
 Wall building
 Waste and junk removal
 Water purification
 Water softening
 Window cleaning
 Welding
 Window installation
 Window repair
 Window screens

See also
 Do it yourself
 Home improvement
 Home repair
 Tradesman

References

Cleaning and maintenance occupations
Home improvement
Domestic work